Kwoun Sun-tae (Hangul: 권순태; Hanja: 權純泰; ; born September 11, 1984) is a South Korean professional footballer who plays as a goalkeeper for  club Kashima Antlers.

Club career

Jeonbuk Hyundai Motors
After graduating from Jeonju University, Kwoun signed his first professional deal with Jeonbuk Hyundai Motors in 2006 and quickly displaced team-mate Lee Kwang-suk as first choice goalkeeper. Kwoun made 43 first team appearances in his first season, most notably winning the 2006 AFC Champions League after beating Al-Karamah SC in the final.

After a successful debut season, Kwoun cemented himself as Jeonbuk's first choice goalkeeper for Jeonbuk under manager Choi Kang-hee. He was an integral part of the team during the 2009 season, where Jeonbuk claimed their first ever K-League title.

Loan to Sangju Sangmu
He continued to play for the club until 2011, when he was required to carry out mandatory military service and joined military club Sangju Sangmu for just under two seasons. During this loan spell, Jeonbuk won the league and again reached the Champions League Final and it being played at Jeonju Stadium, Kwoun used his vacation from the military to go and support the team amongst the fans. He later said that the disappointing experience of seeing Jeonbuk lose at home in this final would change his mentality and spur him on to be more prepared for finals in the future. Returning from military service midway through the 2012 season, Kwoun struggled to break back into the team and played only a handful of games for the remainder of the 2012 season and the 2013 season.

Return to Jeonbuk
After two years spent managing the South Korean national team, Choi Kang-hee returned to manage Jeonbuk in 2013 and by the 2014 season, Kwoun was returned to the starting line-up after the retirement of Choi Eun-sung. Kwoun played a key role as Jeonbuk went on to win back-to-back league titles and would have won three in a row if they were not deducted nine points for their part in a scandal which involved bribing referees during the 2013 season. Kwoun was selected as the best goalkeeper in the league for three straight seasons, being named part of the K League Best XI in 2014, 2015 (as well as winning the Golden Glove award) and 2016.

For the 2016 season, Kwoun was named captain of Jeonbuk and it was arguably the best season of his career. Conceding only 40 goals in the league all season, he was said to be the most reliable goalkeeper in the league. He also went on to win his second AFC Champions League title after a hard-fought 3-2 aggregate win over Al-Ain. Kwoun had a fantastic performance in the second leg, denying Al-Ain striker Douglas multiple times as well as a pulling off a crucial reaction save to deny substitute Ibrahim Diaky late in the game.

Kashima Antlers
When it was later revealed that Jeonbuk would be refused entry into the 2017 AFC Champions League after an additional review into their 2013 bribery scandal, Kwoun eventually accepted an offer of a three year contract from J-League champions Kashima Antlers.

Kwoun was not first-choice goalkeeper with Kashima in his first season, despite being given the number one shirt, as long term servant of the club Hitoshi Sogahata retained the main goalkeeping duties. He was however in goal for the season-opener, as Kwoun won his first trophy with Kashima in his first game after they lifted the 2017 Japanese Super Cup with a 3-2 win over Urawa Red Diamonds. In the 2018 season, Kwoun became first choice goalkeeper and was part of the squad that won the 2018 AFC Champions League – the third time he was won that competition. Kashima were only the third side from Japan to win the title. Much like the 2016 final, Kwoun played magnificently, keeping a clean sheet in both legs against Persepolis. He was rewarded with the player of the week award for his heroics in the second leg after making 6 saves and topping the player ratings.

Kwoun continued to be an ever present part of the team during the 2019 season, but from the 2020 season team-mate Yuya Oki started the majority of games for Kashima in place of Kwoun. With a change in management for Kashima in the 2022 season, Kwoun was back to being first-choice goalkeeper and played the majority of games for the club throughout the season.

International career
In 2012, Kwoun was called up for international duty but did not play. Kwoun made his international debut match for South Korea against Laos on September 3, 2015 and kept a clean sheet. Kwoun went on to make another four appearances for the national team during the qualification round of the 2018 World Cup, only conceding three goals in total. His final international appearance was in a 3-2 defeat to Qatar in June 2017, which led to the sacking of then South Korea manager Uli Stielike. Unfortunately for Kwoun, Stielke's successor Shin Tae-Yong did not pick him in the squad again and he did not make the final 23 man squad for the World Cup.

Career statistics
.

1Other tournaments include Japanese Super Cup and FIFA Club World Cup

Honours

Club
Jeonbuk Hyundai Motors
K League 1: 2009, 2014, 2015
AFC Champions League: 2006, 2016

Kashima Antlers
Japanese Super Cup: 2017
AFC Champions League: 2018

Individual 
K League Classic Best XI: 2014, 2015, 2016
AFC Champions League Player of the week: 2018 finals 2nd leg

References

External links
 
 
 Profile at Kashima Antlers

1984 births
Living people
South Korean footballers
Association football goalkeepers
Jeonbuk Hyundai Motors players
Gimcheon Sangmu FC players
Kashima Antlers players
K League 1 players
South Korea international footballers
People from Gangneung
South Korean Buddhists
Sportspeople from Gangwon Province, South Korea